Palizada is one of the 11 municipalities that make up the Mexican state of Campeche. It is situated in the far south-west corner of the state. The municipal seat, and largest settlement, is the city of Palizada. As of 2010, the population was 8,352.

History and geography
The municipality of Palizada borders to the west with the state of Tabasco and to the east with the neighbouring Campeche municipality of Carmen. It covers a total surface area of 2,071.70km².

Demographics
As of 2010, the municipality had a total population of 8,352.

As of 2010, the town of Palizada had a population of 3,089. Other than the town of Palizada, the municipality had 256 localities, none of which had a population over 1,000.

References

Link to tables of population data from Census of 2005 INEGI: Instituto Nacional de Estadística, Geografía e Informática
Palizada Enciclopedia de los Municipios de México

External links
Ayuntamiento de Palizada Official website 
Municipio de Palizada from official Campeche state government website 

Municipalities of Campeche